Sunshine is the fourth studio album released by The Archies, a fictional bubblegum pop band of The Archie Show and the Archie Comics universe.  The album includes 12 tracks and was issued on Kirshner Records. All tracks were produced by Jeff Barry with the exception of four songs ("Mr. Factory", "Dance", "Comes The Sun" and "One Big Family") that were written and produced by Neil Brian Goldberg.  All four were mistakenly credited to Barry; Goldberg was a staff writer working under Barry's supervision at the time. The album features the single "Sunshine".  The song peaked at number 57 on the Billboard Hot 100.  Another single, "A Summer Prayer For Peace", was only released overseas and topped the charts in South Africa. The album peaked at number 137 on the Billboard Top LPs chart.

Track listing

Charts

References

1970 albums
The Archies albums
Albums produced by Jeff Barry